Dereon Seabron (born May 26, 2000) is an American professional basketball player for the New Orleans Pelicans of the National Basketball Association (NBA), on a two-way contract with the Birmingham Squadron of the NBA G League. He played college basketball for the NC State Wolfpack.

High school career
Seabron played basketball for Lake Taylor High School in Norfolk, Virginia. As a sophomore, he helped his team reach the 4A state title game. In his junior season, Seabron averaged 17.2 points and seven rebounds per game. As a senior, he averaged 22.5 points and 11 rebounds per game, leading Lake Taylor to its first state championship. Seabron was named 4A Player of the Year and All-Tidewater Player of the Year.  He opted to play a postgraduate season at Massanutten Military Academy in Woodstock, Virginia to gain more attention from college programs. A four-star recruit, he committed to playing college basketball for NC State in April 2019 over offers from Georgia, Pittsburgh, Providence and VCU.

College career
Seabron redshirted his first season at NC State after being ruled academically ineligible by the NCAA and losing the appeal. In the regular season finale against Notre Dame, Seabron had his first double-double with 17 points and 13 rebounds, and he earned ACC Freshman of the Week honors. As a freshman, he averaged 5.2 points and 3.5 rebounds per game. On December 1, 2021, Seabron posted a career-high 39 points and 18 rebounds in a 104–100 win against Nebraska in quadruple overtime, breaking the ACC–Big Ten Challenge single-game scoring record. He scored the most points in a game by an NC State player since T. J. Warren scored 42 points against Boston College on March 29, 2014. As a sophomore, Seabron was named ACC Most Improved Player as well as Second Team All-ACC.

Professional career

New Orleans Pelicans (2022–present)
After going undrafted in the 2022 NBA draft, Seabron signed a two-way contract with the New Orleans Pelicans on September 9, 2022.

Career statistics

College

|-
| style="text-align:left;"| 2019–20
| style="text-align:left;"| NC State
| style="text-align:center;" colspan="11"|  Redshirt
|-
| style="text-align:left;"| 2020–21
| style="text-align:left;"| NC State
| 24 || 8 || 17.4 || .485 || .250 || .576 || 3.5 || .8 || .7 || .3 || 5.2
|-
| style="text-align:left;"| 2021–22
| style="text-align:left;"| NC State
| 32 || 32 || 35.8 || .491 || .256 || .713 || 8.2 || 3.2 || 1.4 || .1 || 17.3
|- class="sortbottom"
| style="text-align:center;" colspan="2"| Career
|| 56 || 40 || 27.9 || .490 || .254 || .694 || 6.1 || 2.2 || 1.1 || .2 || 12.1

References

External links
NC State Wolfpack bio

2000 births
Living people
American men's basketball players
Basketball players from Norfolk, Virginia
NC State Wolfpack men's basketball players
New Orleans Pelicans players
Shooting guards
Undrafted National Basketball Association players